Athani is a locality in the Thrissur district, Kerala, India. It is located about 13 km from the district headquarters Thrissur. The Government Medical College, Thrissur is situated about 1.5 km from the town. Also it is the main industrial area of the Thrissur city. There are several government owned and private industries in Athani.

See also
Thrissur
Thrissur District

References

Villages in Thrissur district